Charles A. Lory (1872 –1969) was an American academic administrator.

Career
Lory was born in Sardis, Ohio in 1872. On June 5, 1902, Charles A Lory received an M.S. degree in physics, the first graduate degree in physics at the University of Colorado Boulder.  He served as the president of Colorado State University from 1909 to 1940.

References

External links

1872 births
1969 deaths
Presidents of Colorado State University
University of Colorado Boulder alumni